Club Atlético Claypole is an Argentine football club located in Claypole, Buenos Aires. The team currently plays in Primera D, the 5th level of the Argentine football league system.

History
The club was founded on October 1, 1923. It is claimed that kit uniform was inspired by English side Sunderland even though Sunderland have worn a red and white kit since 1887. Claypole gained the affiliation to Argentine Football Association in 1978 and obtained its first and only title in 1997.

Claypole and Victoriano Arenas played a match in 2011 where all 22 players on the pitch and a combination of 14 subs and coaches received red cards, for a total of 36. This is the most red cards even issued in a senior level game.

Players

Titles
Primera D (2): 1996–97, 2020

References

External links
 
 

 
Association football clubs established in 1923
Football clubs in Buenos Aires Province
1923 establishments in Argentina